Greg Ross (born 2 May 1987) is a former Scottish footballer who played as a right back.

Early life and education

Ross was born in Edinburgh, Scotland.

Ross joined the Dunfermline Athletic youth initiative when he was 14.

Career
He debuted at 17 years and 202 days against Kilmarnock in 2004, becoming the youngest ever player to start a SPL match for the Pars. On 26 November 2005, Ross scored the only goal as Dunfermline sensationally beat Celtic at Celtic Park. He was sent on loan to Third Division side Cowdenbeath in September 2008, after undergoing two knee operations in 15 months. Ross made a winning start to his loan deal, helping the Fife side to beat Berwick Rangers 2–1.

Ross was released by the Pars on 2 May 2010 and signed for Icelandic club Valur the following week.

Ross returned to Scotland in 2011, signing for Forfar Athletic. He moved to Stenhousemuir in the 2012 summer transfer window, but was released by the club at the end of the season after making 33 appearances. In July 2013, Ross signed for SJFA East Super League side Penicuik Athletic. Ross returned to professional football in June 2016, signing for Scottish League Two side Cowdenbeath who he previously had a short loan spell with whilst at Dunfermline. Ross spent four months with the Blue Brazil before joining East of Scotland Football League side Tynecastle.

References

External links
 
  (while on loan with Cowdenbeath)

1987 births
Living people
Footballers from Edinburgh
Scottish footballers
Scottish Premier League players
Scottish Football League players
Scotland under-21 international footballers
Expatriate footballers in Iceland
Scottish expatriate footballers
Scottish expatriate sportspeople in Iceland
Association football defenders
Dunfermline Athletic F.C. players
Cowdenbeath F.C. players
Valur (men's football) players
Forfar Athletic F.C. players
Stenhousemuir F.C. players
Penicuik Athletic F.C. players
Tynecastle F.C. players